Václav Kočí (born July 15, 1979) is a Czech former professional ice hockey defenceman. He played with HC Pardubice in the Czech Extraliga during the 2010–11 Czech Extraliga season.

Career statistics

References

External links 

1979 births
Living people
BK Mladá Boleslav players
Czech ice hockey defencemen
HC Benátky nad Jizerou players
HC Bílí Tygři Liberec players
HC Dynamo Pardubice players
HC Litvínov players
HC Slovan Ústečtí Lvi players
HC Vlci Jablonec nad Nisou players
Motor České Budějovice players
Sportovní Klub Kadaň players
Ice hockey people from Prague